Best is a railway station located in Best, Netherlands.

The station is located on the Breda–Maastricht railway (State Line E) between Tilburg and Eindhoven. The station is operated by Nederlandse Spoorwegen. The station is located in a tunnel and has four platforms.

History

The station was opened on 1 July 1866. It closed on 15 May 1938 and re-opened on 10 June 1940. There have been several different station buildings over the years. The most recent building was finished in 2000, as part of the construction of two extra tracks between Eindhoven and Boxtel, bringing the total to four.

Train services
The station is served by the following service(s):

2x per hour local services (Sprinter) Tilburg Universiteit - Eindhoven
2x per hour local services (Sprinter) 's-Hertogenbosch - Eindhoven - Deurne

External links
NS website 
Dutch Public Transport travel planner 

Railway stations in North Brabant
Railway stations opened in 1866
Railway stations opened in 1940
Railway stations on the Staatslijn E
Railway stations closed in 1938
1866 establishments in the Netherlands
Best, Netherlands
Railway stations located underground in the Netherlands
Railway stations in the Netherlands opened in the 19th century